The Departmental Council of Haute-Corse was the deliberative assembly of the French department of Haute-Corse, a decentralized territorial collectivity from 1976 to 2017. Its headquarters were in Bastia. Following the territorial reform of 2015, the two departmental councils of Corsica (Haute-Corse and Corse-du-Sud) merged on January 1, 2018 with the Territorial Collectivity of Corsica, which already exercised the powers of a region with special status, to form the Collectivity of Corsica.

Composition

The President 
François Orlandi (PRG) was elected on January 20, 2015 following the resignation of Joseph Castelli announced on December 22, 2014.

Vice-presidents (as of 2015)

References 

Haute-Corse
Haute-Corse